Kawanabe (written: ,  or ) is a Japanese surname. Notable people with the surname include:

, Japanese artist
, Japanese painter
, Japanese footballer
, Japanese footballer

Japanese-language surnames